Blame It on Rio is a 1984 American romantic comedy film directed by Stanley Donen and written by Charlie Peters and Larry Gelbart based on the 1977 French film Un moment d'égarement, starring an ensemble cast led by Michael Caine, Joseph Bologna, Michelle Johnson, Valerie Harper, Demi Moore, and José Lewgoy.

Plot 
Matthew Hollis is married to Karen, and father to teenage daughter, Nikki. Victor Lyons, Matthew's colleague and best friend, who is going through a divorce, is father to 17-year-old Jennifer. Matthew's marriage is not going well for reasons that are incoherent. Shortly before they are to embark for a trip to Rio de Janeiro, Brazil, Karen says she is going on vacation to Bahia by herself to "think about everything." Matthew and Victor agree to go to Rio with their daughters. Jennifer and Nikki share a room, where she says to Nikki, "Your father is so sweet... I used to have a crush on him", to which Nikki replies, "Me, too". At the beach, Victor and Matthew see a lot of musicians and pass numerous young girls and women walking around topless. The fathers spot their daughters in their bikinis in the distance, but the girls turn around to reveal that they are topless as well.

After dropping the girls off at a wedding, the men visit a pub. After Victor pairs off with a local divorcée, Matthew winds up at the wedding, where he runs into Jennifer. Suddenly all attendees of the wedding strip down to their briefs and panties and take a dip in the cold ocean. Jennifer insists on having Matthew join them and takes off her top. As soon as Matthew says that the water is warmer than he anticipated, Jennifer passionately kisses him, which Nikki witnesses, and the two proceed to have sex on the beach. The next morning, Matthew stresses it can never happen again but to no avail, Jennifer begins seducing Matthew in various inappropriate situations. At one point, while Victor and Nikki are having breakfast in the garden, Jennifer kisses Matthew while he is shaving and transfers some shaving foam to her cheek. At another point she touches his crotch bulge from under the table while having dinner and eventually the two make love again.

Jennifer tearfully tells her father that she had an affair with an "older man". Victor becomes furious and sets out to hunt down the mystery man, expecting Matthew to help. While Matthew tries to talk Jennifer into ending their relationship, she is determined to never give him up and takes a naked polaroid of herself and gives it to Matthew in public while riding Sugarloaf Cable Car. Matthew ultimately discloses to his friend that Jennifer had the affair with him. Victor is not as irritated as Matthew expects, because Victor is revealed to have been having an affair with Karen.

Jennifer attempts to commit suicide with an overdose of birth control pills, but survives and the incident brings all of the friends closer together, although the men constantly object about each other's sexual misconduct. Karen and Matthew choose to work on their marital problems, Jennifer begins dating a young male nurse she met while recuperating in the hospital, and Matthew thanks daughter Nikki for being the only one who has not misbehaved. As the closing credits start, Matthew, in voice-over narration, says, "You only live once, but it does help if you get to be young twice".

Cast 
 Michael Caine as Matthew Hollis
 Joseph Bologna as Victor Lyons
 Michelle Johnson as Jennifer Lyons
 Demi Moore as Nicole (Nikki) Hollis
 Valerie Harper as Karen Hollis
 José Lewgoy as Eduardo Marques
 Lupe Gigliotti as Signora Botega
 Nelson Dantas as Doctor

Production 
The film was shot on location in Rio de Janeiro.  Johnson, who was 17 at the time of filming, received permission from a court to appear topless and bottomless in some scenes of the film.

Reception 
Vincent Canby, reviewing Blame It on Rio, stated "...there's not a single funny or surprising moment in the movie. However, Blame It on Rio is not simply humorless. It also spreads gloom. It's one of those unfortunate projects that somehow suggests that everyone connected with the movie hated it and all of the other people involved." The Australian newspaper The Canberra Times described Blame It on Rio as "one of the worst movies ever made and definitely the most banal piece of rubbish to have Michael Caine's name on the credits—and he has quite a few bombs to his credit." Roger Ebert gave the film 1 star out of a possible 4, writing: "It's really unsettling to see how casually this movie takes a serious situation. A disturbed girl is using sex to play mind games with a middle-aged man, and the movie get its yuks with slapstick scenes [...] What's shocking is how many first-rate talents are associated with this sleaze."

Rotten Tomatoes gave Blame It on Rio a rating of 8% based on reviews from 25 critics. The consensus summarizes: "It isn't clear who is most culpable for this creepy comedy's sheer wrongness, but its smarmy laughs and uncomfortable romance will leave audiences feeling guilty long afterward."

References

External links 
 
 
 
 

1984 films
1980s English-language films
1984 romantic comedy films
American romantic comedy films
Films directed by Stanley Donen
Films set in Rio de Janeiro (city)
Films shot in Rio de Janeiro (city)
American independent films
American remakes of French films
20th Century Fox films
Films with screenplays by Larry Gelbart
Films about vacationing
American slapstick comedy films
1980s American films